Reparations for slavery is the application of the concept of reparations to victims of slavery and/or their descendants. There are concepts for reparations in legal philosophy and reparations in transitional justice. Reparations can take numerous forms, including: affirmative action, individual monetary payments, settlements, scholarships, waiving of fees, systemic initiatives to offset injustices, land-based compensation related to independence, apologies and acknowledgements of the injustices, token measures, such as naming a building after someone, or the removal of monuments and renaming of streets that honor enslavers and defenders of slavery.

There are instances of reparations for slavery, relating to the Atlantic slave trade, dating back to at least 1783 in North America, with a growing list of modern-day examples of reparations for slavery in the United States in 2020 as the call for reparations in the US has been bolstered by protests around police brutality and other cases of systemic racism in the US. Recently in the US, the call for reparations for racism has been made alongside calls for reparations for slavery.

Despite many calls for reparations, examples of international reparations for slavery consist of recognition of the injustice of slavery and apologies for involvement but no material compensation.

United Kingdom

Slave owners' compensation

The Slave Compensation Act 1837 was an Act of Parliament in the United Kingdom, signed into law on 23 December 1837, to bring about compensated emancipation. Enslavers were paid approximately £20 million in compensation in over 40,000 awards for enslaved people freed in the colonies of the Caribbean, Mauritius and the Cape of Good Hope. This represented around 40 percent of the British Treasury's annual spending budget and has been calculated as equivalent to about £16.5bn in today's terms. Some of the payments were converted into 3.5% government annuities, which caused a drawn-out process.

Abuja Proclamation
The African Reparations Movement, also known as ARM UK, was formed in 1993 following the Abuja Proclamation declared at the First Pan-African Conference on Reparations in Abuja, Nigeria in the same year. The conference was convened by the Organisation of African Unity and the Nigerian government. On 10 May 1993, Bernie Grant MP tabled a motion in the House of Commons that the House welcomes the proclamation and recognised that the proclamation "calls upon the international community to recognise that the unprecedented moral debt owed to African people has yet to be paid, and urges all those countries who were enriched by enslavement and colonisation to review the case for reparations to be paid to Africa and to Africans in the Diaspora; acknowledges the continuing painful economic and personal consequences of the exploitation of Africa and Africans in the Diaspora and the racism it has generated; and supports the OAU as it intensifies its efforts to pursue the cause of reparations." The motion was sponsored by Bernie Grant, Tony Benn, Tony Banks, John Austin-Walker, Harry Barnes, and Gerry Bermingham. An additional forty-six Labour Party MPs signed to support the motion, including future leader of the opposition Jeremy Corbyn.

The Abuja Proclamation called for national reparations committees to be set up throughout Africa and the Diaspora. Bernie Grant formed ARM UK as the co-founder and chairperson, with a core group including: secretary Sam Walker; treasurer Linda Bellos and trustees Patrick Wilmott, Stephen Small, Dorothy Kuya and Hugh Oxley. The organisation aimed to:
 to use all lawful means to obtain Reparations for the enslavement and colonisation of African people in Africa and in the African Diaspora
 to use all lawful means to secure the return of African artefacts from whichever place they are currently held
 to seek an apology from western governments for the enslavement and colonisation of African people
 to campaign for an acknowledgement of the contribution of African people to World history and civilisation
 to campaign for an accurate portrayal of African history and thus restore dignity and self-respect to African people
 to educate and inform African youth, on the continent and in the Diaspora, about the great African cultures, languages and civilisations.

Following the death of Bernie Grant in 2000, ARM UK became inactive.

21st century
In 2004, controversial reparations lawyer Ed Fagan launched a class action lawsuit against insurance market Lloyd's of London for their role in insuring slave ships involved in the transatlantic slave trade. The case was unsuccessful.

On 27 November 2006, British Prime Minister Tony Blair issued a statement expressing "deep sorrow" for Britain's role in the slave trade, saying it had been "profoundly shameful". The statement was criticised by reparations activists in Britain, with Esther Stanford stating that Blair should have issued "an apology of substance", which would then be followed by "various reparative measures including financial compensation." Blair issued another apology in 2007 after meeting with Ghanaian President John Kufuor.

On 24 August 2007, then-Mayor of London Ken Livingstone publicly apologised for London's role in the transatlantic slave trade during a commemoration of the 200th anniversary of the passing of the 1807 Slave Trade Act. In the speech, Livingston called on the British government to pass legislation to create a UK-wide Annual Slavery Memorial Day, which would commemorate slavery.

Africa 
In 1999, the African World Reparations and Repatriation Truth Commission called for the West to pay $777 trillion to Africa within five years.

In September 2001, the United Nations sponsored the World Conference against Racism, Racial Discrimination, Xenophobia and Related Intolerance held in Durban, South Africa. The Durban Review Conference sponsored a resolution stating that the West owed reparations to Africa due to the "racism, racial discrimination, xenophobia, and related intolerance" that the Atlantic slave trade caused. Leaders of several African nations supported this resolution. The former Minister of Justice of Sudan, Ali Mohamed Osman Yassin, stated that the slave trade is responsible for Africa's current problems.

Caribbean 
From the perspective of international law, it is questionable whether slavery, genocide, and other crimes against humanity had been outlawed at the time they were committed in the Caribbean; for example, "Although the factual appearance of genocide can be traced back at least to ancient times, its prohibition by international law appears to be a phenomenon of the early 20th century". Under the international principle of intertemporal law, today's prohibitions cannot be applied retroactively. There is a legal argument suggesting that exceptions to intertemporal law apply in cases of crimes against humanity, as European states and their representatives could not expect slavery to be legal in the future (referred to as teleological reduction of the principle). However, it is a complex area of law.

CARICOM Reparations Commission 

The Caribbean Community (CARICOM), established in 1973, is an intergovernmental organisation that is a political and economic union of 15 member states throughout the Caribbean. Until 1995, it comprised only the English-speaking parts of the Caribbean, until the addition of Suriname (Dutch) in 1995; Haiti and other non-Anglophone nations have since joined.

In 2013, in the first of a series of lectures in Georgetown, Guyana, to commemorate the 250th anniversary of the 1763 Berbice Slave Revolt, Principal of the Cave Hill Campus of the University of the West Indies, Sir Hilary Beckles urged the CARICOM countries to emulate the position adopted by the Jews who were persecuted during the Second World War and have since organized a Jewish reparations fund. Following  Beckles]]' advice, the CARICOM Reparations Commission was created in September 2013. In 2014, 15 Caribbean nations unveiled the "CARICOM Ten Point Plan for Reparatory Justice", which spelled out demands for reparations from Europe "...for the enduring suffering inflicted by the Atlantic slave trade". Among these demands were formal apologies from all nations involved (as opposed to "statements of regret"), repatriation of displaced Africans to their homeland, programs to help Africans learn about and share their histories, and institutions to improve slavery descendants' literacy, physical health, and psychological health. Representatives of Caribbean states have repeatedly announced their intention to bring the issue to the International Court of Justice (ICJ). However,  no action has been taken to bring the Barbadian Government's case to international arbitration.

By country

Antigua and Barbuda
In 2011, Antigua and Barbuda called for reparations at the United Nations, saying "that segregation and violence against people of African descent had impaired their capacity for advancement as nations, communities and individuals". More recently, in 2016, Ambassador of Antigua and Barbuda to the United States, Sir Ronald Sanders, called on Harvard University "to demonstrate its remorse and its debt to unnamed slaves from Antigua and Barbuda." According to Sanders, Isaac Royall Jr., who was the first endowed professor of law at Harvard, relied on the slaves on his plantation in Antigua when establishing Harvard Law School. Sanders recommended these reparations come in the form of annual scholarships for Antiguans and Barbudans.

Barbados
In 2012, the Barbadian government established a twelve-member Reparations Task Force to sustain the local, regional, and international momentum for reparations. Barbados was then leading the way in "calling for reparations from former colonial powers for the injustices suffered by slaves and their families."

Barbados was said to be "leading the way" in calling for the payment of reparations for slavery.

, the Barbados National Task Force on Reparations, part of the CARICOM Reparations Commission, is seeking reparations from wealthy British MP Richard Drax for his ancestors' involvement in slavery. The Drax family still owns a large estate in Barbados; Richard Drax is said to be worth "at least £150m". If the Commission's request to return Drax Hall to Barbados is refused, the government intends to take the matter to international arbitration.

Guyana
In 2007, Guyana President Bharrat Jagdeo formally called on European nations to pay reparations for the slave trade. President Jagdeo stated, "Although some members of the international community have recognized their active role in this despicable system, they need to go step further and support reparations." In 2014, the Parliament of Guyana established a "Reparations Committee of Guyana" to further investigate the impact of slavery and create formal demands for reparations.

Haiti

Having attained its independence from France in 1804 through a brutal and costly war, the case for reparations to Haiti was tenable. Shortly after that, France would demand that the newly founded Haiti pay the French government and enslavers 90 million francs for the "theft" of the enslaved people's own lives (compensated emancipation) and the land that they had turned into profitable sugar and coffee-producing plantations to recognize the fledgling nation's independence formally. French banks and Citibank financed this debt and finally paid off in 1947.

In 2003, then-President of Haiti Jean-Bertrand Aristide demanded that France compensate Haiti for over US$21 billion, the modern equivalent of the 90 million gold francs Haiti was forced to pay to gain international recognition.

Jamaica
In 2004, a coalition of Jamaican activists, including Rastafari members, demanded that European nations which had participated in the slave trade should fund the resettlement of 500,000 Rastafari in Ethiopia (which they estimated to be 72.5 billion pound sterling, or roughly, $150,000 per person). The British government rejected the demand.

In 2012, the Jamaican Government revived its reparations commission to consider whether the country should seek an apology or reparations from Britain for its role in the slave trade. The opposition cited Britain's role in abolishing the slave trade as a reason that Britain should issue no reparations. In 2021, the Jamaican government again revisited the idea of reparations for slavery. It was reported that the Jamaican government was seeking some 7 billion pound sterling in reparations for the damages of slavery, including the 20,000,000 paid out to former enslavers by the British government.

United States 

Slavery ended in the United States in 1865 with the end of the American Civil War and the ratification of the Thirteenth Amendment to the United States Constitution, which declared that "Neither slavery nor involuntary servitude, except as a punishment for crime whereof the party shall have been duly convicted, shall exist within the United States, or any place subject to their jurisdiction". At that time, an estimated four million African Americans were set free.

Support for reparations 

Within the political sphere, a bill demanding slavery reparations has been proposed at the national level, the "Commission to Study and Develop Reparation Proposals for African-Americans Act," which former Rep. John Conyers Jr. (D-MI) reintroduced to the United States Congress every year from 1989 until his resignation in 2017. As its name suggests, the bill recommended the creation of a commission to study the "impact of slavery on the social, political and economic life of our nation"., however there are cities and institutions which have initiated reparations in the US (see   for a list).

In 1999, African-American lawyer and activist Randall Robinson, founder of the TransAfrica advocacy organization, wrote that America's history of race riots, lynching, and institutional discrimination have "resulted in $1.4 trillion in losses for African Americans". Economist Robert Browne stated the ultimate goal of reparations should be to "restore the black community to the economic position it would have if it had not been subjected to slavery and discrimination". He estimates a fair reparation value anywhere between $1.4 to $4.7 trillion, or roughly $142,000 for every black American living today.  Other estimates range from $5.7 to $14.2 and $17.1 trillion.

In 2014, American journalist Ta-Nehisi Coates published an article titled "The Case for Reparations", which discussed the continued effects of slavery and Jim Crow laws and made renewed demands for reparations. Coates refers to Rep. John Conyers Jr.'s H.R.40 Bill, pointing out that Congress's failure to pass this bill expresses a lack of willingness to right their past wrongs.

In September 2016, the United Nations' Working Group of Experts on People of African Descent encouraged Congress to pass H.R.40 to study reparations proposals. Still, the Working Group did not directly endorse any specific reparations proposal. The report noted that there exists a legacy of racial inequality in the United States, explaining that "Despite substantial changes since the end of the enforcement of Jim Crow and the fight for civil rights, ideology ensuring the domination of one group over another, continues to negatively impact the civil, political, economic, social and cultural rights of African Americans today." The report notes that a "dangerous ideology of white supremacy inhibits social cohesion among the US population".

The topic of reparations gained renewed attention in 2020 as the Black Lives Matter movement named reparations as one of their policy goals in the United States.

In 2020, rapper T.I. supported reparations that would give every African American million and asserted that slavery caused mass incarcerations, poverty, and other ills.

Opposition to reparations 
Opposition to slavery reparations is reflected in the general population. In a study conducted by YouGov in 2014, only 37% of Americans believed that enslaved people should have been provided compensation in the form of cash after being freed. Furthermore, only 15% believed that descendants of enslaved people should receive cash payments. The findings indicated a clear divide between black and white Americans. The study summarized its findings: "Only 6% of white Americans support cash payments to the descendants of slaves, compared to 59% of black Americans. Similarly, only 19% of whites – and 63% of blacks – support special education and job training programs for the descendants of slaves."

In 2014, in response to Ta-Nehisi Coates's article "The Case for Reparations", conservative journalist Kevin D. Williamson published an article titled "The Case Against Reparations." In it, Williamson argues, "The people to whom reparations are owed are long dead".

See also 

 Reparations Agreement between Israel and West Germany (1952)
 Restitution
 Legal remedy
 Reparation (legal)
 Reparations (transitional justice)
 War reparations

References

Further reading
 
 Andreas Buser. Colonial Injustices and the Law of State Responsibility: The CARICOM Claim to Compensate Slavery and (Native) Genocide, Heidelberg Journal of International Law (2017) pp. 409–446.
 Araujo, Ana Lucia. Reparations for Slavery and the Slave Trade: A Transnational and Comparative History, New York, London: Bloomsbury Academic, 2017. 
 Ta-Nehisi Coates. The Case for Reparations, The Atlantic, June 2014.
 Hilary Beckles. Britain's Black Debt: Reparations for Caribbean Slavery and Native Genocide, Kingston: University of the West Indies Press, 2013. 
  (HTML version) with a definition and the components of full and effective reparation, as laid out in principles 19 to 23.
 Richard F. America. Wealth of Races: The Present Value of Benefits from Past Injustices. Praeger Press, 2002. 
 W. Burlette Carter. True Reparations, The George Washington Law Review, Vol. 68, No. 1021, 2000.
 Richard F. America. Racial Inequality, Economic Dysfunction, and Reparations, Challenge, Vol. 38, No. 6, 1995, pp. 40–45.

External links

 Reparations Now Toolkit, Movement for Black Lives, 2019.
 The Case for Black Reparations, Richard F. America, C-SPAN video of the TransAfrica Forum, 11 January 2000.
 Making Amends: Debate Continues Over Reparations for U.S. Slavery, National Public Radio, August 27, 2001.
 Caribbean Reparations Commission

 
Slavery